Satonari (written: 達成 or 智成) is a masculine Japanese given name. Notable people with the name include:

, (1856–1872), Japanese prince
 (1899–1961), Imperial Japanese Navy officer
 (1733-1749), Japanese lord

Japanese masculine given names